Sérignan-du-Comtat is a commune in the Vaucluse department in the Provence-Alpes-Côte d'Azur region in southeastern France.

The entomologist Jean-Henri Fabre (1823–1915) died in Sérignan-du-Comtat.

Points of interest
 Harmas de Fabre
 Musée-Atelier Werner Lichtner-Aix

See also
Communes of the Vaucluse department

References

Communes of Vaucluse